Experimental hardcore may refer to:
 Mathcore
 Post-hardcore
 Other music combining a hardcore punk influence with an experimental or avant-garde approach